Brodnitsy is a rural locality (a village) in Pavlovskoye Rural Settlement, Suzdalsky District, Vladimir Oblast, Russia. The population was 108 as of 2010. There are 7 streets.

Geography 
Brodnitsy is located 25 km south of Suzdal (the district's administrative centre) by road. Sadovy is the nearest rural locality.

References 

Rural localities in Suzdalsky District